Shieldsville is an unincorporated community in Shieldsville Township, Rice County, Minnesota, United States.

The center of Shieldsville is generally considered near the junction of State Highway 21 (MN 21) and Rice County Road 10 (Dodd Road).  Other routes include County Roads 37, 38, and 67.

Nearby places include Faribault, Kilkenny, Waterville, and Montgomery.  Shieldsville is located in section 1 of Shieldsville Township.

ZIP codes 55021 (Faribault), 56052 (Kilkenny), 56096 (Waterville), and 56069 (Montgomery) all meet near Shieldsville.

History
Shieldsville, named after its founder, American politician and U.S. Army officer, James Shields, was platted in 1856. It was founded around the Irish St. Patrick Catholic Church.

In the settlement's early years, land within the area was sold for $2.00 per acre with the mission of attracting Irish immigrants to settle in the area.

On July 29, 2002, The St. Patrick Church of Shieldsville was hit by lightning for the second time in its history and was severely destroyed. It was rebuilt 2 years later on August 1, 2004.

Culture
Shieldsville holds a Fall Festival for the town and the surrounding area every September 29.

References

Unincorporated communities in Minnesota
Unincorporated communities in Rice County, Minnesota